Bunyip is an Australian children's cartoon series based on the famous mythical creature.

Characters
Bunyip
Dingo
Platypus
Wombat
Kookaburra
Bandicoot
Possum

Episodes
Bunyip and the Dingo
Bunyip and the Great Aussie Bight
Bunyip and the Boomeroo
Bunyip and the Lyrebird
Bunyip and the Possum
Bunyip and the Wood Nymph
Bunyip and the Kookaburra
Bunyip and the Wombat
Bunyip and the Bandicoot
Bunyip and the Platypus

Video release
One VHS tape was released by ABC Video in 1991.

References 

1989 Australian television series debuts
1989 Australian television series endings
Australian children's television series
Australian Broadcasting Corporation original programming
English-language television shows